The Circle and the Blue Door is the debut studio album from British rock band Purson. The album was released on 29 April 2013, via Rise Above Records.

Reception

The Circle and the Blue Door received favourable reviews from professional critics.

New Noise compared the album songs to such greats as Pink Floyd, Janis Joplin, Camel, Blackmore's Night and The Beatles' record Magical Mystery Tour.

Track listing
"Wake Up Sleepy Head" – 2:06
"The Contract" – 4:11
"Spiderwood Farm" – 5:09
"Sailor's Wife's Lament" – 3:59
"Leaning On a Bear" – 3:27
"Tempest and the Tide" – 5:06
"Mavericks and Mystics" – 3:48
"Well Spoiled Machine" – 5:09
"Sapphire Ward" – 5:02
"Rocking Horse" – 4:25
"Tragic Catastrophe" – 5:21

References

2013 debut albums
Rise Above Records albums